Ed Lewis is an American politician in the Missouri House of Representatives, elected in November 2020 to represent District 6, and is a member of the Republican Party (United States).

Missouri House of Representatives

Committee assignments 

 Budget
 Rural Community Development
 Utilities
 Workforce Development
 Subcommittee on Appropriations—Education
Source:

Electoral history

References

Living people
Year of birth missing (living people)
Republican Party members of the Missouri House of Representatives